Vanamala or Vanamali may refer to:

 Vanamala (actress) (1915–2007), Indian actress
 Vanamala (film), a 1951 Indian Malayalam film
 Vanamali, a type of Vaijayanti or theological flower in Hinduism

It is also a surname in south india